Karl Taylor Compton (September 14, 1887 – June 22, 1954) was a prominent American physicist and president of the Massachusetts Institute of Technology (MIT) from 1930 to 1948.

The early years (1887–1912) 
Karl Taylor Compton was born in Wooster, Ohio, on September 14, 1887, the eldest of three brothers (including Arthur Compton and Wilson Martindale Compton) and one sister, Mary. His father, Elias Compton, was from an old American Presbyterian family, and his mother, Otelia Augspurger Compton, was from an Alsatian and Hessian Mennonite family that had recently immigrated to the United States. He came from a remarkably accomplished family in which his brother Arthur became a prominent physicist and sister Mary a missionary.

Beginning in 1897, Compton's summers were spent camping at Otsego Lake, Michigan while attending Wooster public schools in fall, winter and summer. He took hard labor jobs starting at age eleven to help pay for college, working carrying hods for construction projects, as a farm hand, mule skinner, a book canvasser, in tile and brick factories and surveyed the first mile of paved road in Ohio.

In 1902, Compton skipped a grade and went into Wooster University's preparatory department for the last two years of high school. In 1908, he graduated from Wooster cum laude with a bachelor of philosophy degree, then in 1909 his master's thesis A study of the Wehnelt electrolytic interrupter was published in Physical Review. During 1909–1910 he was an instructor in Wooster's chemistry department before entering a graduate program at Princeton University. There he received the Porter Ogden Jacobus Fellowship, and worked with Owen Willans Richardson and jointly published several papers on electrons released by ultraviolet light, electron theory and on the photoelectric effect. Richardson went on to receive the Nobel Prize in some of the areas where Compton contributed. In 1912, Compton received his Ph.D. from Princeton summa cum laude.

Reed College and WW I (1913–1918) 
In June 1913, Compton married Rowena Raymond.  They moved to Reed College in Portland, Oregon, where Compton was an instructor in Physics.  In 1915, he returned to Princeton as an associate professor of physics.  He also took a consultancy at the General Electric Corporation.  He contributed to the war effort at Princeton and with the Signal Corps.  In December 1917, Compton was attached to the US Embassy in  Paris as an associate science attaché.

Princeton University (1918–1930) 
After the Armistice of 1918, the end of World War I Compton returned home to Princeton, his wife and three-year-old daughter Mary Evelyn. In June 1919, Compton was made a full professor, and worked in the Palmer Laboratory where his gift for teaching was legendary.  His research was in the area of electronics and spectroscopy in subject areas such as passage of photoelectrons through metals, ionization, the motion of electrons in gases, fluorescence, theory of the electric arc, absorption and emission spectra of mercury vapor, and collisions of electrons and atoms. Unfortunately, Rowena died in the fall of 1919.  In 1921, Compton married Margaret Hutchinson, with whom he had a daughter, Jean, and a son, Charles Arthur.  In 1927, Compton was named Director of Research at the Palmer Laboratory and Cyrus Fogg Brackett professor. In 1929 he was appointed head of the department. Over one hundred papers were published in his name during his time at Princeton.

In 1923, Compton was elected a member of the American Philosophical Society and in 1924 a member of the National Academy of Sciences for which he was chairman of the Section of Physics (1927–1930). He was named vice-president of the American Physical Society (APS) in 1925 and in 1927 became its president. Compton was also a fellow of the Optical Society of America, a member of the American Chemical Society, the Franklin Institute and other professional engineering societies.

Massachusetts Institute of Technology (1930–1954) 
In 1930, Compton accepted an invitation from the MIT Corporation to be president of the Massachusetts Institute of Technology (MIT), an engineering school that was redefining the relationship between engineering and science. He took office at the beginning of the Great Depression in America, a time of economic turmoil and a time when science was under attack as a source of social ills and national despair. Compton was to strengthen basic scientific research at the Institute while becoming a spokesman for science and technology.

During Compton's service as President, the organization went through a revolutionary change. He developed a new approach to education in science and engineering, the influence of which was felt far beyond MIT. Significantly, he was active in the Society for the Promotion of Engineering Education, and its president in 1938. He was a leader in establishing new standards for the accreditation of engineering criteria through his role as chairman of the Committee on Engineering Schools of the Engineer's Council for Professional Development. He believed in broad-based education for scientists and engineers that was responsive to the needs of the time, and that science should be an element of industrial progress.

In the early 1930s, Compton joined with members of the APS to form the American Institute of Physics (AIP). While he was chairman of the AIP board during 1931–1936, the organization became a federation of several disparate societies for developing subject areas in physics. It sponsored publication of research results in the rapidly expanding study of physics during that era.

In 1948, Compton resigned his post as President of MIT and was elected president of the MIT Corporation.  He held that position until his death on June 22, 1954.

Cooperation with the military (1933–1949) 
In 1933, U.S. President Roosevelt asked Compton to chair a new Scientific Advisory Board that lasted two years. This put him into a forefront of scientists that perceived a need for reliable scientific advice at the highest levels of government. The start of World War II motivated the start of the National Defense Research Committee (NDRC), created in 1940 under the chairmanship of Vannevar Bush. Compton was a member of the NDRC and became head of Division D which was responsible for assembling a group of academic and industrial engineers and scientists that would study primarily radar, fire control and thermal radiation. In 1941, the NDRC was assimilated into the Office of Scientific Research and Development (OSRD) where Compton chaired the United States Radar Mission to the United Kingdom. In August 1942, Roosevelt appointed Compton to the Rubber Survey Committee, which investigated and made recommendations to help resolve conflicts on technical direction in the development of synthetic rubber, arising due to the loss of rubber supply during the war.  In 1945, Compton was selected as one of eight members of the Interim Committee appointed to advise President Harry S. Truman on the use of the atomic bomb.  When Japan surrendered in 1945, World War II came to an end and Compton left the OSRD.  In 1946, Compton chaired the President's Advisory Commission on Military Training. From 1946 to 1948, he was a member of the Naval Research Advisory Committee. Compton chaired the Joint Research and Development Board from 1948 to 1949, when he stepped down for health reasons.

Awards and honors 
 The Rumford Prize of the American Academy of Arts and Sciences in 1931
 The Presidential Medal for Merit in 1946 for hastening the termination of hostilities by means of the radar research and development program he directed.
 The Public Welfare Medal from the National Academy of Sciences. in 1947 for his eminence in the application of science to the public welfare.
 The Washington Award of the Western Society of Engineers in 1947
 Honorary Commander, Civil Division, of the Most Excellent Order of the British Empire in 1948
 Knight Commander of the Royal Norwegian Order of St. Olav in 1948
 The Lamme Medal of the American Society for Engineering Education in 1949
 The Hoover Medal jointly from the American Institute of Electrical Engineers, the American Society of Mechanical Engineers, American Institute of Mining and Metallurgical Engineers and the American Society of Civil Engineers in 1950
 The William Procter Prize for Scientific Achievement of the Scientific Research Society of America in 1950
 Officer in the French Legion of Honor in 1951
 The Priestley Memorial Award of Dickinson College in 1954 for his contributions to the "welfare of mankind through physics" 

The lunar crater Compton is named after Compton and his brother Arthur, who was also an influential scientist.
Compton was also the recipient of thirty-two honorary degrees.

Publications 
 Karl Taylor Compton, A Study of the Whenelt Electrolytic Interrupter, Physical Review, Vol. 30, No. 2, pp. 161–179, American Institute of Physics, American Physical Society, Cornell University, 1910.

References 
 Office Of The National Research Council, Biographical Memoirs, National Academies Press, (October 1, 1992),

External links
Photograph of Kart Taylor Compton and other members of the NDRC 
Official MIT Presidential Biography
Julius A. Stratton's biography of Compton
Annotated bibliography for Karl Compton from the Alsos Digital Library for Nuclear Issues
National Academy of Sciences Biographical Memoir

|-

1887 births
1954 deaths
20th-century American physicists
American Presbyterians
College of Wooster alumni
Manhattan Project people
Massachusetts Institute of Technology faculty
Members of the United States National Academy of Sciences
Presidents of the Massachusetts Institute of Technology
Princeton University alumni
U.S. Synthetic Rubber Program
20th-century American academics
Presidents of the American Physical Society